Dellwood is a populated place within the town of Maggie Valley in Haywood County, North Carolina, United States.

History
Prior to European colonization, the area that is now Dellwood was inhabited by the Cherokee people and other Indigenous peoples for thousands of years. The Cherokee in Western North Carolina are known as the Eastern Band of Cherokee Indians, a federally recognized tribe.

Geography

Dellwood is located at latitude 35.523 and longitude -83.028. The elevation is 2,753 feet.

Demographics

References

External links

Unincorporated communities in Haywood County, North Carolina
Unincorporated communities in North Carolina